Antonio Calcagni (1538 in Recanati – 1593) is an Italian sculptor of the Renaissance period.

He apprenticed with Girolamo Lombardo in Recanati, where he completed a statue of Pope Gregory XIII (1574) started by Ludovico Lombardi and Ascoli. He also completed a statue of the poet Annibale Caro in bronze. He also completed bronze reliefs for the Basilica of Loreto. He collaborated with a younger Tiburzio Vergelli. He designed the monumental entry doors to the church of Loreto, but these were completed by his nephew Tarquinio Jacometti and his pupil Sebastiano Sebastiani.

Works
Monument to Cardinal Niccolò Caetani di Sermoneta (1580) Basilica, Loreto
Bronze relief of Deposition, Basilica, Massilla Chapel, Loreto
Medallion depicting Barbara Massilla, Basilica, Massilla Chapel, Loreto
Depiction of Father Dantini, Church of Sant'Agostino, Recanati
Virgin and child, Villa Coloredo Mels, Recanati
Monument to Pope Sixtus V (1587), Piazzale della Basilica, Loreto
Monument in bronze of Agostino Filago (1592), Basilica, Loreto
Monumental South door, Basilica, Loreto

Sources

16th-century Italian sculptors
Italian male sculptors
1536 births
1593 deaths